Jhumka are a style of earring worn by women of the Indian subcontinent.  

Under the Mughal Empire, the Kharanpool jhumka evolved into a single jewel, still maintaining its bell shape. The jhumka, also known as jhumki, have maintained their status throughout history in India, Pakistan and Bangladesh as coveted earrings. The origin of this popular earring style can be traced back to ancient temple statues(which make them as old as 300s BCE).

References

Jewellery of India
Bareilly
Jewellery of Pakistan